Ranchers Bees Stadium (aka Kaduna Township Stadium) is a multi-purpose  arena in Kaduna, Nigeria.  It is currently used mostly for football matches and is the home stadium of Ranchers Bees Football Club (aka Aruwa Boys)  and Kaduna United Football Club. The stadium has a capacity of 5,000 people. Kada City FC use the Ranchers Bees Stadium for home games in the NPFL.

Football venues in Nigeria
Kaduna